PRFC may refer to:

Pasadena Rugby Football Club
Paulton Rovers F.C.
Peebles Rovers F.C.
Penrhiwceiber Rangers F.C.
Providence Rugby Football Club
Portland Rugby Football Club (Maine)
Portland Rugby Football Club (Oregon)
Portsmouth Rugby Football Club
Puerto Rico FC